Des Meadowcroft (31 March 1880 – 22 September 1959) was an Australian rules footballer who played with Carlton in the Victorian Football League (VFL).

Notes

External links 

	
Des Meadowcroft's profile at Blueseum

1880 births
Australian rules footballers from Victoria (Australia)
Carlton Football Club players
1959 deaths